Elvio Do Rosario van Overbeek (born 11 January 1994) is a Dutch footballer who plays as a winger for SteDoCo.

Career
Van Overbeek was born in Angola. He made his professional debut as Jong PSV player in the second division on 3 August 2013 against Sparta Rotterdam.
 

He signed for Northern Irish club Glentoran on 6 August 2019. After one season there, he returned to the Netherlands to sign for third-tier Tweede Divisie club De Treffers in October 2020. However as the competition was on hiatus due to COVID-19, he never played for De Treffers. Van Overbeek joined Kozakken Boys in October 2021. He made his debut for the club on 30 October in a 2–1 loss in the Tweede Divisie to TEC.

References

External links
 
 www.psvjeugd.nl profile
 
 

Living people
1994 births
People from Dongen
Association football wingers
Dutch footballers
Netherlands under-21 international footballers
Netherlands youth international footballers
Eredivisie players
Eerste Divisie players
NIFL Premiership players
PSV Eindhoven players
Go Ahead Eagles players
De Graafschap players
SC Telstar players
Glentoran F.C. players
Expatriate association footballers in Northern Ireland
Dutch expatriate sportspeople in Northern Ireland
De Treffers players
Kozakken Boys players
Tweede Divisie players
Dutch people of Angolan descent
People from Cabinda Province
Footballers from North Brabant
Dutch expatriate footballers